The Woman in Me is the second studio album by Canadian country singer-songwriter Shania Twain and her first to be produced by long-time collaborator and then-husband Robert John "Mutt" Lange. Released on February 7, 1995, it went on to become her biggest-selling recording at the time, selling 4 million copies by the end of the year, and was eventually certified 12× Platinum by the RIAA on December 1, 2000, for 12 million shipments throughout the United States. The album has sold an estimated 20 million copies worldwide. It was ranked number 8 on CMT's list of 40 Greatest Albums in Country Music in 2006. The album is credited with having influenced the sound of contemporary country music. Eight singles were released from the album for its promotion, including "Whose Bed Have Your Boots Been Under?", "Any Man of Mine", "(If You're Not in It for Love) I'm Outta Here!" and "You Win My Love", with each accompanied by a music video.

Background
By 1993, Shania Twain was promoting her self-titled debut album by singing at local gigs in the United States with little more than a backing track CD. While the album itself did not perform well in the charts, it attracted the attention of rock producer Robert John "Mutt" Lange, and the pair began having long-distance telephone conversations with each other. They bonded over Twain's love of rock music and Lange's love of American country music. After meeting with him at the CMA Music Festival/Fan Fair in June 1993, they began exchanging song ideas with each other and started doing songwriting together. During this time, they developed a romance that culminated in their wedding on December 28, 1993.

It was at this time that Twain was pressed by her record company to return to the studio to start putting together her second album. Twain admitted in her From This Moment On memoir that although she was initially reluctant to do so, she told Luke Lewis that she had co-written some songs with Lange, and he agreed to let her record some demos for her album, even though he feared that Twain would deviate too much from the Nashville sound. Twain and Lange continued their songwriting after their wedding and in early 1994, constructed a demo tape produced by Lange of some of their songs which was played to record executives for the first time at Morin Heights Studio. Although some executives were worried because the "less country" sound was different from Twain's debut, Lewis decided to let Twain continue her collaboration with Lange, and hired Lange as the primary producer of the album.

Composition and single releases
"Whose Bed Have Your Boots Been Under?", a country-flavored song about a woman confronting her lover about his frequent infidelity, was released as the first single from the album. Originally, Twain wanted "Any Man of Mine", a song containing both heavy rock and heavy country influences, to be the first single, but was persuaded to change her mind and go with the safer option. While "Whose Bed Have Your Boots Been Under?" slowly gained some attention on the country charts, it was "Any Man of Mine" which gave Twain her first country Top 10 and Number 1 hit, as well as her first appearance on the Billboard Hot 100, peaking at number 31. The third single is Twain's sentimental ballad and the title track "The Woman in Me (Needs the Man in You)", and became her first adult contemporary hit, accompanied by a video shot in Egypt. It also peaked at number 74 on the Billboard Hot 100.

"God Bless the Child", an a cappella prayer that Twain prayed to herself after her parents died, was originally the last track recorded for the album in 1994. However, in early 1995, just prior to the album release, Twain and Lange experimented with recording different versions of songs for both country audiences and pop-rock audiences. This meant that the two songs in consideration, the fourth single "(If You're Not in It for Love) I'm Outta Here!", described by Twain as "a warning to pickup artists everywhere, set to a pulsating rock beat, and embroidered with slinky slide guitar" and fifth single "You Win My Love", a solely Lange-written love song involving car metaphors, actually had their country and pop-rock counterparts recorded at the same time. Just before the track-listing was finalised, separate country and pop-rock mixes were derived from the original masters, as Twain and Lange intended to release both mixes to the release formats of the album. The pop-rock mixes were shelved in favor of the country mixes during the album's release, but returned billed as "Mutt Lange Mix"es for both songs' single releases. "I'm Outta Here!" and "You Win My Love" became Twain's second and third No.1 hits at country radio, while "I'm Outta Here!" became Twain's first breakthrough hit in Australia. "I'm Outta Here" also peaked at number 74 on the Billboard Hot 100.

After more success with another No.1 hit, sixth single "No One Needs to Know", which was selected for the soundtrack to the 1996 film Twister, and a minor country hit, seventh single "Home Ain't Where His Heart Is (Anymore)", Twain decided to turn "God Bless the Child", the eighth and final single, into a full-length song. She and Lange co-wrote new verses touching on the turbulent lives in people's society, and Lange developed two new instrumentals for Twain to record her vocals on: a country version with a banjo and a pop version with a subtle electronic beat. Both versions contain the same acoustic drum set, guitars and chord arrangements, and also feature the Fisk University Jubilee singers and a local performing arts choir on backing vocals. "God Bless the Child" peaked at number 75 on the Billboard Hot 100, but was her least successful single from the album at country radio, peaking at number 48.

25th Anniversary
On October 2, 2020, The Woman in Me was re-released as the "Diamond Edition", which is available in four variants: a limited edition clear crystal vinyl, standard vinyl, 2 CD set and a 3 CD set packaged with a 48 page hard cover book. It is also available as a digital download known as the "Super Deluxe Edition". The Diamond Edition is "remastered" with a bonus disc that includes live performances and the single mixes. The 3 CD Set (also the Super Deluxe Edition digital download) version includes a third disc with early recordings of The Woman in Me, which were recorded 12 months prior to the release of the album.

Track listing

Personnel
Credits from album liner notes.

 Sam Bush – mandolin
 Larry Byrom – acoustic guitar, electric rhythm guitar
 Billy Crain – slide guitar
 Glen Duncan – fiddle
 Dann Huff – tic tac bass, lead guitar, electric guitar, slide guitar, guitar textures, wa-wa guitar (Sic), jangle guitar, claps
 Paul Franklin – pedal steel guitar, Pedabro
 Rob Hajacos – fiddle
 Ronn Huff – string arrangements
 John Hughey – pedal steel guitar
 David Hungate – bass guitar, fretless bass, double bass
 John Barlow Jarvis – piano, Wurlitzer electric piano
 Nick Keca – claps
 Robert John "Mutt" Lange – backing vocals, claps
 Paul Leim – drums, percussion, tambourine, shaker, door slam on "(If You're Not in It for Love) I'm Outta Here!"
 Brent Mason – lead guitar, electric guitar, six-string bass guitar
 Terry McMillan – percussion, cowbell, harmonica, boot stomps on "Whose Bed Have Your Boots Been Under?"
 Hargus "Pig" Robbins – piano
 Brent Rowan – electric guitar textures
 Joe Spivey – fiddle
 Shania Twain – lead and backing vocals, claps, footsteps on "(If You're Not in It for Love) I'm Outta Here!"
 Nashville String Machine – string section

Recording personnel

 Robert Charles – assistant overdub engineer
 Lee Groitzsch – overdub engineer
 Nick Keca – engineer
 Robert John "Mutt" Lange – producer
 Wayne Morgan – assistant overdub engineer
 Warren Peterson - engineer
 Simon Pressey – engineer
 Ron "Snake" Reynolds – engineer
 Brian Tankersly - overdub engineer
 Craig White - assistant engineer

Singles chronology

US Country
 "Whose Bed Have Your Boots Been Under?"
 "Any Man of Mine"
 "The Woman in Me (Needs the Man in You)"
 "(If You're Not in It for Love) I'm Outta Here!"
 "You Win My Love"
 "No One Needs to Know"
 "Home Ain't Where His Heart Is (Anymore)"
 "God Bless the Child" (Single Mix - Country Version)

Europe
 "Any Man of Mine"
 "The Woman in Me (Needs the Man in You)"
 "(If You're Not in It for Love) I'm Outta Here!"
 "You Win My Love"
 "No One Needs to Know"
 "God Bless the Child" (Single Mix - Pop Version)

Australia Pop
 "The Woman In Me (Needs the Man in You)"
 "(If You're Not in It for Love) I'm Outta Here!" (Mutt Lange Mix)
 "You Win My Love" (Mutt Lange Mix)
 "No One Needs to Know"

Music videos
 "Whose Bed Have Your Boots Been Under?"
 "Any Man of Mine"
 "The Woman in Me (Needs the Man in You)"
 "(If You're Not in It for Love) I'm Outta Here!"
 "You Win My Love"
 "No One Needs to Know"
 "Home Ain't Where His Heart Is (Anymore)"
 "God Bless the Child"

Charts

Weekly charts

Decade-end charts

All-time charts

Year-end charts

Certifications

https://www.shaniatwain.com/news/shania-twains-woman-me-diamond-edition

Awards
 Canadian Country Music Association Awards (CCMA's): 
Album of the Year (1995)
Special Achievement Award (Top selling album by a female country artist ever) (1997)
Top Selling Album (1997)
 Academy of Country Music Awards (ACMA's): Album of the Year (1996)
 Billboard Music Awards: Country Album of the Year (1996)
 Golden Pick Awards: Favorite Album (1996)
 Grammy Awards: Best Country Album (1996)
 Radio & Records' Trade Magazine Poll: Best Country Album (1996)
 RPM's Big Country Music Awards - (Canada): Album of the Year (1996)
 CMT's 40 Greatest Albums in Country Music number 8 in 2006, the highest rank by a woman in that list.

See also
 List of best-selling albums by women
 List of best-selling albums in the United States

Release history

References 

1995 albums
Shania Twain albums
Mercury Nashville albums
Albums produced by Robert John "Mutt" Lange
Grammy Award for Best Country Album
Canadian Country Music Association Album of the Year albums
Canadian Country Music Association Top Selling Album albums